The Snogo Snow Blower was used on the Trail Ridge Road in Rocky Mountain National Park, United States. Manufactured in 1932 by the Klauer Engineering Company of Dubuque, Iowa, the plow was actually a snowblower and featured advanced features such as an enclosed cab, four wheel drive and roll-up windows. It was used in the park until 1952.

The Blower used a Climax Blue Streak six-cylinder gasoline engine (6x7=1188cuin), developing 175 horsepower at 1200 RPM. Through the use of an eight-speed gearbox, speed could be varied from 1/4 mile/hr up to a maximum of 25 mph, when not moving snow. It was claimed to be capable of throwing snow 100 feet to the side.

Similar blowers, used at Crater Lake and Yosemite National Parks, no longer exist. In 1943 the plow was loaned to Rapid City Air Base for use in keeping the airfield's runways clear, then returned in the spring. The National Park Service gave the plow to the city of Estes Park, Colorado in 1952, which used it until 1979, when it was damaged by water entering through the exhaust.  The plow was returned to the park and put on display at the Beaver Meadows Visitor Center. The park plans to restore the plow to operating condition.

See also
National Register of Historic Places listings in Larimer County, Colorado

References

External links

Current manufacturer's website

Transportation in Larimer County, Colorado
National Register of Historic Places in Rocky Mountain National Park
Snowplows
Vehicles introduced in 1932
Industrial equipment on the National Register of Historic Places
Buildings and structures in Larimer County, Colorado
Road transportation on the National Register of Historic Places
Transportation on the National Register of Historic Places in Colorado